Jimmy Hill (July 22, 1928 – August 29, 2006) was an American football player. Nicknamed "Iron Claw", Hill played for the Chicago/St. Louis Cardinals and Detroit Lions of the National Football League (NFL). He ended his professional career with the American Football League's Kansas City Chiefs in their AFL championship year of 1966.

Early life
Hill played football first as Booker T. Washington High School as an offensive end, where he was named to the All-Texas team in 1945 and 1946. He also excelled in track and field. He attended Sam Houston State College in Austin, Texas, excelling in football, sprint, baseball, and basketball, being named the best all-around athlete in his last three years in college.

He tried his hand at semi-pro football in St. Louis, Missouri in 1953, playing a few games in 1953 and 1954 before the team folded. He tried making the Cleveland Browns in 1954 but missed the cut before being signed by the St. Louis Cardinals in 1955, where he elected to switch to defense, making the team as a 27-year-old rookie.

Pro football career
With Billy Stacy, Larry Wilson and Jerry Norton, Hill was an idea corner threat for the Cardinals, and Wilson cited him as a mentor during his rookie season about how to be a professional. He was named to the Pro Bowl in three straight seasons from 1960 to 1962, owing to his status as a shut-down corner, which resulted in four interceptions in 1961 and two in 1962.  Hill was cited by numerous players and coaches as an efficient corner, with Del Shofner calling him "inhuman" and his backfield coach Ray Willsey calling him one of the best of the league, and Hill did not allow a touchdown pass from 1960 to 1962.

Hill's career highlights were overshadowed by his performance in a game on October 20, 1963, against the Green Bay Packers. When making a tackle on quarterback Bart Starr on the sideline, Starr kicked Hill in the mouth only for Hill to follow with a punch to the face of Starr. He was assessed a 15-yard penalty and ejection; Hill lost two teeth on the kick while Starr broke a bone in his throwing hand and missed four games while neither was suspended. Hill apologized to Starr after the game, which Starr forgave, but Sports Illustrated covered the story a few weeks later and portrayed the moment as a negative one for Hill, with journalist Walter Bingham calling it "the most reprehensible play of the season" (either by ignoring or not knowing of Hill's apology). Hill was booed by the St. Louis crowd after the story broke out, and he was quoted as saying that it hurt him deeply to the point where he did not want to be introduced with the other starters before games. He retired briefly after the 1964 season but returned to do stints with the Lions and Chiefs in 1965 and 1966, with the latter tenure of three games earning him a championship (although he did not play in the postseason run for the Chiefs). Years later, Hill was cited by The Arizona Republic as the 98th best player in Cardinals history.

Personal life
After retirement, Hill stayed in St. Louis while operating music stores and various bars and restaurants in the area and serving as a part-time scout for the Chiefs. Hill died at the age of 78 in 2006.

See also
 List of American Football League players

References

NFL.com player page

1928 births
2006 deaths
American football defensive backs
Sam Houston Bearkats football players
Chicago Cardinals players
St. Louis Cardinals (football) players
Detroit Lions players
Kansas City Chiefs players
Eastern Conference Pro Bowl players
Players of American football from Dallas
American Football League players